Stora Enso Oyj (from   and  ) is a manufacturer of pulp, paper and other forest products, headquartered in Helsinki, Finland. The majority of sales takes place in Europe, but there are also significant operations in Asia and South America. Stora Enso was formed in 1998, when the Swedish mining and forestry products company Stora AB merged with the Finnish forestry products company Enso Oyj. In 2021, the average number of employees was over 23,000. In 2015, Stora Enso was ranked seventh in the world by sales and fourth by earnings, among forest, paper and packaging industry companies. For the first two quarters of 2018, the company was ranked second by net earnings among European forest and paper industry companies. The corporate history can be traced back to the oldest known preserved share certificate in the world, issued in 1288. Based on this, some observers consider Stora Enso to be the oldest limited liability company in the world.

History 
Stora Enso was formed by the merger of Swedish mining and forestry products company Stora and Finnish forestry products company Enso Oyj in 1998.

History of Stora 

The oldest preserved share in the Swedish copper mining company Stora Kopparberg (Falun Mine) in Falun was issued in 1288. It granted the Bishop of Västerås 12.5 per cent ownership, and it is also the oldest known preserved share in any company in the world. The corporate status of the company was further recognized in 1347, when King Magnus IV of Sweden granted it a charter. Some observers consider that these facts make Stora and its successor Stora Enso the oldest existing corporation or limited liability company in the world.

For some periods during the 17th century, the mine provided two thirds of the world production of copper. In the 18th century, the copper mining gradually decreased in importance, and therefore, in 1731, the company bought its first iron ore mine. By the 1860s, iron ore was economically more important to the company than copper.

Stora Kopparbergs Bergslags AB was incorporated as a modern shareholder company in 1862. Towards the end of the 19th century, it diversified from mining and entered pulp and paper production. In the 1970s, most of the mining and steel mill operations of the company were divested, and the focus changed to forestry-related activities. In 1984, the company name was shortened to Stora AB. The copper mine closed down in 1992.

In 1997, the year before the merger with Enso, Stora had 20,400 employees and a turnover of 44.5 billion SEK. The company owned 2.3 million hectares of forest of which 1.6 million hectares (an area larger than Connecticut) in Sweden and the rest in Canada, Portugal and Brazil. It also produced 7.5 TWh of mostly hydroelectric power.

A 1997 article in Harvard Business Review praised Stora's ability to adapt to changing circumstances over the centuries.

In 1998, the company merged with Enso to form Stora Enso.

History of Enso

1850–1899
The roots of Enso go back to 1850's, when Wilhelm Gutzeit started Wilh. Gutzeit & Co. in Norway. He was a native of Königsberg who had moved to Norway to work as a secretary for his step-cousin Benjamin Wegner, an industrialist. Only one of Gutzeit's five children survived to adulthood and thus his son Hans Gutzeit started to work with him in the 1860's and inherited the company in 1869. In 1871 he started to operate in Finland, together with Lars J. Bredesen, who was from Norway too. Gutzeit started a sawmill in Kotka in November 
1872 and called it W. Gutzeit & Comp. In 1897 the company became a Finnish company, and its name was changed to Aktiebolaget W. Gutzeit & Co.

1900–1998

As Gutzeit & Co bought Aktiebolaget Pankakoski in 1908 and Enso Träsliperi Ab in Jääski in 1911, the board production was added to company portfolio.

In 1918 the company shares were bought by Finland which became independent in 1917, and Gutzeit became fully state owned company.

In 1924 the company headquarter was moved from Kotka to Helsinki. The company's name was changed to Enso-Gutzeit Osakeyhtiö in 1928.

The company started to build Kaukopää mill in Imatra in 1935. At the time it was the biggest sulfate pulp mill in Europe.

Summa paper mill in Hamina was taken into use in 1955.

The company's name was changed to Enso-Gutzeit Oy in 1981.

Enso-Gutzeit bought A. Ahlström Osakeyhtiö's forest industries at Varkaus in 1987.

In 1993 the company bought units from Tampella, Tampella Forest Oy and Tambox Europe's units from Finland and Sweden.

In 1996 two state owned forest companies were merged and Enso-Gutzeit Oy and Veitsiluoto Oy from North Finland became Enso Oyj.

In 1997, it acquired a majority stake in the German forestry company Holtzmann & Cie.

In 1998, the company merged with Stora to form Stora Enso.

History of Stora Enso

1998–2009 
After the merger, Stora Enso expanded its operations by acquiring wood products businesses and bought paper merchant businesses in Europe. In 2000 the company bought Consolidated Papers in North America. Stora Enso also slowly expanded its operations in South America, Asia and Russia.

In 2000, Stora Enso acquired the North American pulp and paper manufacturer Consolidated Papers for EUR 4.9 billion. The acquisition has, in hindsight, been noted in the financial press as a massive value destroyer. In the same year, Stora Enso and AssiDomän formed a joint company, Billerud AB, to produce packaging paper.

In 2002, Stora Enso started investigating the possibility of establishing plantations and production facilities in Guangxi, China.

In recent years the company has gone through heavy restructuring. The North American operations were divested in 2007 to NewPage Corporation. Stora Enso has sold and closed down some of its mills in Finland, Sweden and Germany. The closure of a plant in Kemijärvi in 2008 and subsequent events were subject to significant Finnish media coverage.

In 2009, Stora Enso entered into a joint venture in Uruguay, called Montes del Plata, with access to 250,000 hectares of woodland and the intention to build a large-capacity mill.

2010–2019 
In 2010, Stora Enso acquired a 30 per cent stake in the Chinese printed paper packaging manufacturer Inpac.

In September 2012, Stora Enso signed an agreement with Packages Ltd., the largest packaging company of Pakistan, to set up a joint venture named Bulleh Shah Packaging (Pvt.) Ltd. at Kasur, Pakistan. The ownership stake for Stora Enso was 35 per cent. In 2017, the stake was sold back to Packages Ltd., at a loss of EUR 19 million.

Between 2006 and 2014, the share of paper products of the total sales decreased from 62 per cent to 38 per cent, while packaging and wood products increased their shares of the revenue, as the company, according to Bloomberg News, was "betting on renewable packaging as online shopping grows." In 2015, the Financial Times and Bloomberg News reported that Stora Enso was investing in biomaterials and renewable construction products as possible future growth areas.

By 2016 Stora Enso owned 90 per cent of Inpac.

In July 2017, the Financial Times reiterated that a focus on renewable packaging, biomaterials and construction products formed part of the strategic direction of Stora Enso, while also reporting that the revenue from paper had decreased further to 30 per cent of the total sales. It also reported that the current and foreseeable market conditions were such that forestry industry companies in general received and could be expected to receive comparatively low shares of their profits from paper production.

In 2018, Stora Enso, along with 23 other Finnish and Swedish companies, formed a joint venture named Combient for research and knowledge sharing in the areas of artificial intelligence, deep learning, big data and automation.

Examples of notable products launched in 2017–2019 were 
cardboard-based packaging under the name EcoFishBox as an alternative to polystyrene boxes for transportation of fresh fish, 
industrial-scale supply of lignin under the name Lineo as an alternative to phenol-based adhesives,
 prototypes of biodegradable drinking straws, DuraSense biocomposites which enable the use of renewable wood-based fibres which can be used as substitutes for fossil-based plastic, and
a new retail solution which merges in-store and online shopping through RFID-enabled e-kiosks. The service is offered in co-operation with Atos.

2020– 

In the beginning of 2020 Stora Enso started a new division called Forest. It included
Stora Enso's forest assets in Sweden 
the 41% share of Tornator with the majority of its forest assets located in Finland 
wood supply operations in Finland, Sweden, Russia and the Baltic countries.

In July 2021 Stora Enso informed that it was selling its RFID tag technology called ECO to Grupo CCRR.

In March 2022, Stora Enso announced its intention to sell four paper mills located in Anjala in Finland, Hylte and Nymölla in Sweden and Maxau in Germany. If no buyer could be found, the company would continue to run the mills.

Market

Products and services by division 

In 2021, Stora Enso offer products and services through six corporate divisions.

The Biomaterials division sells pulp, as well as additional products that can be extracted biochemically from wood and other sorts of biomass.
The Packaging materials division sells varieties of paperboard for packaging of dry and liquid products, including food, as well as for graphic printing purposes.
The Forest division has wood supply operations in Finland, Sweden, Russia and the Baltic countries.
The Packaging solutions division sells corrugated fiberboard, other types of paperboard used in production of packaging containers, as well as complete packaging boxes and equipment and services related to packaging production.
The Paper division sells paper for commercial printing and office use, as well as services for the printing industry, such as paper supply management.
The Wood products division sells construction materials that have been produced using wood as a raw material.

In 2021 the sales figures and relative contributions to group earnings by divisions were:

Operations 

Stora Enso has the majority of its operations in Europe.
In 2021 
26 % of the personnel worked in Finland, 
22 % in Sweden, 
13 % in China, 
9 % in Poland, 
5% in Czech Republic,
5 % in Russia and
4 % in Austria. 
13% of the employees worked in other European countries (for example in Baltic states, Belgium, France, Germany and Spain), 3% in Brazil and Uruguay, and 1% in other countries.

Headquarters 
The first Stora Enso HQ in Helsinki was designed by Alvar Aalto as the head office of Enso-Gutzeit Oy. The building was taken into use in 1961. In 2008, Stora Enso sold the building to the German property company Deka Immobilien GmbH for €30 million and started renting the building, while also declaring its intention to move to other rented premises in the Helsinki area.

In December 2021, it was announced that the construction of Stora Enso's new headquarters in Katajanokka had started. Other office space and a hotel were also planned for the building, which is owned by the occupational pension company Varma. The building was due to be completed in spring 2024. Stora Enso moved to a temporary headquarters in a property owned by Varma in Salmisaari.

Joint ventures 

Veracel is a joint venture between Stora Enso (50 percent ownership) and Suzano Papel e Celulose in Brazil.

In Uruguay, Stora Enso (50 percent ownership) and Celulosa Arauco y Constitución operate the Montes del Plata joint venture.

Governance

Key people 

Since 1 December 2019, Annica Bresky has been the CEO of Stora Enso.

Previous CEOs were 
Karl-Henrik Sundström (from 2014 to 2019) 
Jouko Karvinen (from 2007 to 2014) and 
Jukka Härmälä (from the creation of Stora Enso in 1998 to 2007).

The board of directors in 2022: Antti Mäkinen (chair of board), Håkan Buskhe (vice chair of the board), Elisabeth Fleuriot, Hock Goh, Helena Hedblom, Kari Jordan, Christiane Kuehne, Richard Nilsson, and Hans Sohlström.

Ownership 

In December 2021, the Finnish state was, through the state-owned Solidium fund and Social Insurance Institution of Finland), the largest owner by number of shares, while the Wallenberg family foundations, through FAM AB, was the second largest. These two owners were also the largest ones by number of votes.

The five biggest owners on 31 Dec 2021 were:
Solidium Oy
FAM AB
Social Insurance Institution of Finland (KELA)
 Ilmarinen Mutual Pension Insurance Company 
 Varma Mutual Pension Insurance Company

Language 

Following the merger, English became the lingua franca of the company. A study of the implications of this for the effectiveness of Stora Enso's internal business communication, published in the academic journal Business Communication Quarterly, concluded that the analyzed communication "seemed to work well".

Controversies

Cartel 
Metsä Group and Stora Enso were fined €500,000 for forming a cartel in 2001.

Accusations of wrongful accounting 
The North American part of the group was sold in 2007 to NewPage Corporation with a net loss of about 4.12 billion dollars. According to a Swedish television documentary, there have been accusations that to cover the loss, the accounting was manipulated, which was revealed in 2010. The documentary also claims that huge dividend payments were made illegally and top management was aware of that fact and on purpose manipulated numbers to be able to pay dividends.

Gerard Goodwyn, the company's head of accounting who spoke publicly about the accounting mistake, was fired in 2010.

In 2013, Stora Enso published a report written by independent law firms, which the company had commissioned to investigate the accusations. According to the report, the investigations performed did not find any evidence of illegal acts or wrongful financial reporting, apart from mistakes that had already been communicated and corrected by 2009. The findings of the investigations were also been reported to the Finnish Financial Supervisory Authority, which found no reason to take further action. In articles commenting on the report, the Finnish newspaper Helsingin Sanomat stated that they had been contacted by the source of the accusations in 2010 but that, after attempting to confirm the accusations, they had not considered that there were sufficient grounds for a news story.

Environmental concerns 
Eucalyptus cultivation by Stora Enso has been discussed critically, especially in relation to the 2011 documentary film Red Forest Hotel.

Nova Scotia Forest Industries, the Canadian corporate identity of Stora Forest Industries (as it was known in the day) in 1983 was pursued in the Nova Scotia Supreme Court—case name Palmer v Nova Scotia Forest Industries—and did emerge victorious. The case went on to influence the practice of Canadian environmental law. What neighbours objected to was the spraying of the dioxin 2,4,5-Trichlorophenoxyacetic acid Agent Orange pesticide.

Human rights concerns 
The Swedish program Kalla fakta reported in 2014 that Stora Enso used child labor in its activities in Pakistan, and that the company had been aware of it since 2012. In response, the company denied that child labor existed directly in the operations of its joint venture partner in Pakistan, but admitted that it was present in its supplier networks. It stated that its partner, Bulleh Shah Packaging, was taking short-term action to remedy the situation in areas where child labor was known to exist, and was also working to mitigate child labor in the long term by addressing its root causes. In 2017, Stora Enso divested its business interest in Pakistan.

Legionella infection 
In 2019, at least 32 people got infected and two people died due to legionnaires' disease after being infected by steam coming from a Legionella pneumophila contaminated cooling tower of the Stora Enso factory located in Ghent, Belgium. The cooling tower had an aerobic count of over 1,000,000, about ten times the urgent action limit of 100,000 micro-organisms per mL at 30 °C

Corporate responsibility 

In July 2014 Stora Enso started to collaborate with Save the Children around children's rights. The collaboration concerned policies and processes with regard to supply chain issues in Pakistan.

In April 2015, Stora Enso entered into a partnership with ILO, with the aims of progressively eliminating child labor from the supply chain in Pakistan and promoting decent work conditions. The experiences in Pakistan prompted Stora Enso to appoint an executive vice president for sustainability to its group leadership team, and to include sustainability managers in its division leadership teams.

In 2016, Stora Enso qualified for inclusion on the "Climate A list" of the CDP environmental organization, a status awarded to 193 of 1,839 companies sampled.

Stora Enso was the main sponsor of the FIS Nordic World Ski Championships 2017 in Lahti. The company provided the games with items made of renewable materials, including two spectator shelters built from cross laminated timber elements, which were subsequently donated to the host city.

See also 
William Lehtinen, Enso-Gutzeit's post-war rebuilder and CEO
Great Copper Mountain
Ahlstrom
Enso (town)
List of Finnish companies
List of oldest companies
Svenska Cellulosa Aktiebolaget
UPM-Kymmene

References

External links 

Yahoo! - Stora Enso Oyj Company Profile

1288 establishments in Europe
Manufacturing companies based in Helsinki
Finnish brands
Companies established in the 13th century
Companies listed on Nasdaq Helsinki
Pulp and paper companies of Finland
Companies related to the Wallenberg family
Multinational companies headquartered in Finland
1998 establishments in Finland
Packaging companies of Finland